Mansford is a private European multi-strategy private equity real estate firm owned and controlled by its management. Mansford was formed in 1995 and has invested directly in income producing properties, real estate development projects, indirect investments and managed structured transactions totaling circa £2.4 billion since inception.  Mansford was the investor behind Chelsea Harbour having acquired it from P&O in 1999.  The group currently owns a number of prominent assets in the UK including the Manchester Arena (which they acquired in 2012),  SkyDome Arena in Coventry, Castle Quarter, three of Cardiff's historical listed arcades, Woolwich Estate and a number of high profile office and residential properties in London.

References

External links
Official Website

Property companies of the United Kingdom
Companies based in the City of Westminster